Mangerton or Mangerton Mountain, at , is the 19th-highest peak in Ireland on the Arderin list, and the 26th–highest mountain according to the Vandeleur-Lynam list.  Mangerton is the tallest mountain in the Mangerton Mountain Group, also called the Mangerton Mountains or the Mountains of East Kerry, a range that includes five other major mountains that have a height above . Mangerton's western slopes lie within the Killarney National Park. On Mangerton's north-western face lies a deep corrie lake called the Devil's Punchbowl, which is a popular scenic destination for hill walkers; although the mountain is often overlooked by walkers due to the proximity of its more scenic and accessible neighbour, Torc Mountain.  The far northern slopes of Mangerton was the site of an important 13th-century battle between the Mac Cárthaigh (Gaelic forces), and the FitzGeralds (Norman forces), known as the "Tooreencormick battle site".

Naming
Tempan discussed the possibility that an alternative interpretation of  may be worth considering, as it could be the noun  with the suffix ach. Tempan notes P. S. Dinneen's Foclóir Gaedhilge agus Béarla—Irish-English Dictionary (1927), defines  as "movement" or "shaking". Thus the adjective (not listed in any dictionary) could mean "moving", "shaking", or "quaking", which could refer to the physical movement of Mangerton bog prevalent on the southern slopes, or could be understood figuratively as meaning "vacillating" or "fickle".

Geography

Mangerton

Mangerton's flat boggy summit plateau includes the satellite summits of Mangerton North Top  and Glencappul Top , and its "horseshoe-shaped" massif includes the summit of Stoompa . The Horses' Glen (or Glencappul), and the Devil's Punchbowl carve deep hollows, or corries on the north-west and north-east sides of Mangerton's massif, but the southern flanks form a huge plateau, one of the most extensive areas of mountain wilderness in Ireland, where herds of red deer and sika deer still roam.  

There are three lochs that flow from Managerton's corries into the Horse's Glen (or Glencappul), namely the lowest, Lough Garagarry (Loch Garaigre), the middle, Lough Mannagh (Loch Meáin) and the Lough Erhogh, which is a hanging glacial lake set into a corrie on Mangerton's north-east face.

Mangerton's western slopes lie within the Killarney National Park.

Mangerton Mountain's height and topographic prominence, qualifies it to meet the British Isles Marilyn classification, as well as the Arderin, Simm and Hewitt classifications.  Mangerton Mountain ranks as the 10th-highest mountain in Ireland on the MountainViews Online Database, 100 Highest Irish Mountains, where the prominence threshold is over 100 metres (e.g. higher mountains with sub-100-metre prominences are excluded).

Range

Surrounding Mangerton are 25 other peaks with an elevation above  in a range known as the Mangerton Group (or Mangerton Mountains).  The range is bounded by the "square" road system surrounding Mangerton, being the N71 to the north and the west side, the N22 to the east side, and the narrow R569 road from Kenmare to the N22 via Kilgarvan on the south side.  Most notable are Dromderalough, and its slightly higher Dromderalough North-East Top, as well as  Crohane, and Knockbrack.  It also includes the tourist peak of Torc Mountain  in the north-west corner.

Hill walking 

Mangerton's flat boggy summit plateau means that it can get overlooked when guidebooks of Ireland's best walks are compiled, particularly given its proximity to the rocky ridges and summits of the MacGillycuddy's Reeks; sometimes even nearby Torc Mountain is recommended instead.  However, Mangerton's scale, summit views and deep corries are well regarded, and its proximity to Killarney town and ease of access are recognised by climbers.

The most direct route to the summit of Mangerton is via the 4–5 hour  Devil's Punchbowl Route. The summit plateau of Mangerton can be difficult to navigate in poor or misty weather as there are few features.

A variation of the Devil's Punchbowl Route is the inclusion of Stoompa, in a 5–6 hour  route, that can either be done as an extension of the Devil's Punchbowl route (e.g. over and back from Mangerton's summit to Stoopma), or as a "horseshoe" or "loop-route" that starts up the Devil's Punchbowl on the westside but finishes by descending down the northern slopes of Stoompa on the eastside.

Tooreencormick battle site

The far northern slope of Mangerton was the site of a battle in 1262 between the Mac Cárthaigh (Gaelic forces, being the Kingdom of Desmond) and the FitzGeralds (Anglo-Norman forces, being the Geraldines), following the rout at the Battle of Callann Glen near Kilgarvan the previous year.  The battle site is marked on the ordnance maps and also by a commemorative stone monument, and is known as Tooreencormick after Cormac MacCarthy Reagh, who was killed during the clash (his brother Fínghin Mac Carthaigh had been killed at the Battle of Callann). Other notable knights including Gerald Roche, "the third best baron in Erin", were slain at Tooreencormick. Despite the losses, the battle is considered a MacCarthy success as the Anglo-Normans were kept out of South Kerry and West Cork (i.e. the Kingdom of Desmond), for the next three centuries.

List of peaks

See also

Lists of mountains in Ireland
List of mountains of the British Isles by height
List of Marilyns in the British Isles
List of Hewitt mountains in England, Wales and Ireland

Notes

References

Bibliography

External links
MountainViews: The Irish Mountain Website Mangerton
The Database of British and Irish Hills , the largest database of British Isles mountains ("DoBIH")
Hill Bagging UK & Ireland, the searchable interface for the DoBIH
Ordnance Survey Ireland ("OSI") Online Map Viewer

Hewitts of Ireland
Marilyns of Ireland
Mountains and hills of County Kerry
MacCarthy dynasty
FitzGerald dynasty
Mountains under 1000 metres